Kohl Children’s Museum of Greater Chicago is a children's museum in Glenview, Illinois that provides a hands-on learning laboratory for children ages birth to 8. It is named for philanthropist Dolores Kohl, daughter of the founder of Kohl’s department stores, who founded the museum through her education foundation in 1985.  Located on an  site, including a  museum building and a  outdoor exhibit space, the museum features exhibits and programs aligned to the Illinois State Learning Standards and designed to make learning fun and interesting for young children.

History
In 1985, the museum was opened as an extension of the Kohl Teaching Center. It was located in Wilmette, Illinois along Green Bay Road (Illinois Route 131). In 2005, the museum moved to a new location in Glenview, Illinois, in "The Glen", the redevelopment of the former Naval Air Station Glenview site. The new building is roughly twice the size of the original one.

Accessibility 
The museum is equally available to guests with any level of physical, visual, auditory, or cognitive challenge. All public areas are 100% ADA-compliant. The facility and all exhibits have been designed using the principles of universal design, which go beyond accessibility with an approach that uses multi-sensory experiences as educational tools. These experiences allow all guests with any level of physical, visual, auditory, and cognitive ability to experience the Museum and its offerings.

Green building 
Kohl Children’s Museum has created an environmentally friendly, energy-efficient facility that has earned Silver-level certification as a LEED (Leadership in Energy and Environmental Design) building from the U.S. Green Building Council.

Signage and activities provide children and families with hands-on learning opportunities about environmental concerns in both the indoor and outdoor exhibit spaces, accessible year-round.

Exhibits 
Kohl Children’s Museum houses 17 hands-on, interactive exhibits.

Visitors 
Around 350,000 people visit Kohl Children’s Museum each year. The museum has over 7,500 member families.

Outreach programs 
For many years, the museum has reached out to underserved and at-risk communities through its Early Childhood Connections program, working primarily with Chicago Public Schools. The museum is now able to offer its programs to families in the nearby village and city of Wheeling and Waukegan and has also developed outreach programs on anti-bias initiatives and healthy lifestyles in 2007 and 2008.

References

External links 
 Kohl Children's Museum

Children's museums in Illinois
Museums in Cook County, Illinois
Glenview, Illinois